Dance Again is a 2012 song by Jennifer Lopez

Dance Again may also refer to:

Music

Albums
 Dance Again (Edmundo Ros album), 1962
 Dance Again... the Hits, a 2012 greatest hits album by Jennifer Lopez
 Dance Again World Tour, a 2012 concert tour by Jennifer Lopez in support of Dance Again... the Hits
 Jennifer Lopez: Dance Again, a 2014 documentary film starring Jennifer Lopez.
 Dance Again (LIFE Worship album), 2014

Songs
 "Dance Again" (Gareth Gates song), 2003
 "Dance Again" (John Zorn song), 2013
 "Dance Again" (Selena Gomez song), 2020

See also 
 "I Just Wanna Dance Again", a song by Amanda Lear from her twelfth studio album Heart
 "Never Gonna Dance Again", a song by the Sugababes from their fifth studio album Change
Never Gonna Dance Again, a 2020 studio album by Taemin